Marsha Leonette Smith is a Jamaican attorney-at-law and Labour Party politician currently serving as Member of Parliament for Saint Ann North Eastern.

Political career 
Smith was elected in the 2020 general election.

In February 2022, a number of her constituents protested calling for her resignation citing her perceived lack of presence in the community.

Personal life 
Her father Ernie Smith represented Saint Ann South Western from 2002 to 2011.

References 

Living people

Year of birth missing (living people)
Jamaican women lawyers
21st-century Jamaican politicians
21st-century Jamaican women politicians
Members of the House of Representatives of Jamaica
Jamaica Labour Party politicians
People from Saint Ann Parish
21st-century Jamaican lawyers
Members of the 14th Parliament of Jamaica